Grépiac is a commune in the Haute-Garonne department in southwestern France.

Geography
The commune is bordered by six other communes: Venerque to the north, Vernet to the northwest, Issus to the northeast, Labruyère-Dorsa to the east, Auterive to the south, and finally by Miremont across the Ariège river to the southwest.

The river Ariège flows through the commune, forming a border with Miremont.

Population

See also
Communes of the Haute-Garonne department

References

Communes of Haute-Garonne